Nameless Detective is the protagonist in a long-running mystery series by Bill Pronzini set in the San Francisco area.

The first novel, The Snatch, was published in 1971. As of 2013, there are 40 novels featuring "Nameless," and two short story collections.

Though the character's full name is never revealed in the series (his first name is Bill), some background details of the detective's life have been occasionally mentioned. An Italian American (Quarry, 1992), he was raised by a devoutly Roman Catholic mother, and an abusive alcoholic father, as described in Demons (1993). Nameless served in U.S. military intelligence during the Vietnam War era, and then became a police officer before working as a private investigator. He had an on-again, off-again romance with a woman named Kerry; the pair married in Hardcase (1995). He is a connoisseur of beer, collects old pulp magazines, and generally does not carry a firearm.  Twice at least, characters call the character "Bill" : In Boobytrap (1998) and in Strangers (2014).

Thrilling Detective cites Pronzini as stating that when he imagines the Nameless Detective, he sees Bill Pronzini. The Readers' Advisory Guide to Mystery describes Nameless as rooted in the classic private investigators of American mystery fiction, but updated as a "more realistic detective, someone who ages and changes" over the course of the series.

Nameless Detective novels

The Snatch, Random House, (1971)
The Vanished, Random House, (1973)
Undercurrent, Random House, (1973)
Blowback, Random House, (1977)
Twospot, (With Collin Wilcox), Putnam, (1978)
Labyrinth, St. Martin's, (1980)
Hoodwink, St. Martin's, (1981)
Scattershot, St. Martin's, (1982)
Dragonfire, St. Martin's, (1982)
Bindlestiff, St. Martin's, (1983)
Case File (short stories), St. Martin's, (1983)
Quicksilver, St. Martin's, (1984)
Nightshades, St. Martin's, (1984)
Double (With Marcia Muller), St. Martin's, (1984)
Bones, St. Martin's, (1985)
Deadfall, St. Martin's, (1986)
Shackles, St. Martin's, (1988)
Jackpot, Delacorte, (1990)
Breakdown, Delacorte, (1991)
Quarry, Delacorte, (1992)
Epitaphs, Delacorte, (1992)
Demons, Delacorte, (1993)
Hardcase, Delacorte, (1995)
Spadework (short stories), Crippen & Landru, (1996)
Sentinels, Carroll & Graf, (1996)
Illusions, Carroll & Graf, (1997)
Boobytrap, Carroll & Graf, (1998)
Crazybone, Carroll & Graf, (2000)
Bleeders, Carroll & Graf, (2002)
Spook, Carroll & Graf, (2003)
Scenarios (short stories), Forge Books, (2005)
Nightcrawlers, Forge Books, (2005)
Mourners, Forge Books, (2006)
Savages, Forge Books, (2007)
Fever, Forge Books, (2008)
Schemers, Forge Books, (2009)
Betrayers, Forge Books, (2010)
Camouflage, Forge Books, (2011)
Hellbox, Forge Books, (2012)
Kinsmen, (novella), Cemetery Dance Publications, (2012)
Femme, (novella), Cemetery Dance Publications, (2012)
Nemesis, Forge Books, 2013
Strangers, Forge Books, 2014
Vixen, Forge Books, 2015
ZigZag, (collection), Forge Books, 2016
 Endgame, Forge Books, 2017

References

Novel series
Fictional private investigators
Fictional characters without a name